Sami Tamminen (born July 19, 1997) is a Finnish professional ice hockey forward playing for Visby/Roma HK of Hockeyettan.

Career
Tamminen made his Liiga debut for KooKoo during the 2016–17 Liiga season, playing 29 games and scored one goal and three assists. He also had a loan spell with KeuPa HT of Mestis that season where he played five games.

The following season, Tamminen played 34 games for KooKoo and registered four goals and three assists. After scoring no points in 18 games during the 2018–19 Liiga season, Tamminen was loaned to KOOVEE of Mestis for the remainder of the season.

After failing to make the KooKoo lineup for the 2019–20 Liiga season, Tamminen was once again sent out on loan to Mestis, this time to Hokki for an indefinite period. He would play the entire season with Hokki, scoring seven goals and nine assists in 23 games as the team finished bottom of the Mestis standings. On August 6, 2020, Tamminen moved to Sweden and signed for Visby/Roma HK of Hockeyettan.

Career statistics

References

External links

1997 births
Living people
Finnish ice hockey forwards
Hokki players
KeuPa HT players
KooKoo players
KOOVEE players
People from Valkeala
Sportspeople from Kymenlaakso